The Witch's Head is the second novel by H. Rider Haggard, which he wrote just prior to King Solomon's Mines.

Background
Haggard wrote the novel following his debut effort Dawn. He was unable to find any magazine that would serialise the story, but it was accepted for publication by the firm that had put out Dawn. Haggard later wrote that "although, except for the African part, it is not in my opinion so good a story as Dawn, it was extremely well received and within certain limits very successful." The 1893 edition was illustrated by Charles H. M. Kerr.

Reception
The book was a minor success, earning Haggard a profit of fifty pounds.

Haggard later named his daughter Dorothy after the heroine in the novel.

References

External links
 Images and bibliographic information for various editions of The Witch's Head at SouthAfricaBooks.com

Novels by H. Rider Haggard
British adventure novels
1885 British novels
Hurst and Blackett books